TSG Pfeddersheim is a German association football club from the Pfeddersheim suburb of Worms, Rhineland-Palatinate.

The club's most notable achievement has been to qualify for the first round of the DFB-Pokal on six occasions, in 1989–90, 1993–94, 1995–96, 1996–97, 2000–01 and 2013–14.

History
The club was formed in 1982, when the football department of the multi-sports club TSG Pfeddersheim, formed in 1886, left the mother club. TSG Pfeddersheim Fußball, as the new club was officially called, won promotion to the tier-four Verbandsliga Südwest, the highest league of the Southwest football federation. In this league too TSG achieved good results, culminating in a league championship in 1992 and promotion to the third division Oberliga Südwest.

Pfeddersheim spend the next eight seasons in the Oberliga, achieving good results in the first four seasons. It missed out on qualifying for the new Regionalligas in 1994, the new third tier of the German league system, but finished an excellent third in the league in 1996. After this results the club declined and TSG was relegated again from the Oberliga in 2000. TSG was unable to recover, instead suffering another drop in 2002, now to the Landesliga, where it was relegated from too in 2003.

After an absence of seven seasons the club was back in the Verbandsliga in 2009, becoming an upper table side once more. Another league title in 2012 took the team up to the Oberliga once more which had now been renamed Oberliga Rheinland-Pfalz/Saar.

The club plays its home games at the Uwe-Becker-Stadion, which holds 3,000.

DFB-Pokal
The club has made it to the first round of the DFB-Pokal, Germany's national cup competition, on six occasions. In 1989–90 the team defeated VfB Gaggenau 2–0 in the first round to lose to Kickers Offenbach 1–3 in the second. Its second appearance, in 1993–94, saw the club receive a bye in the first round, defeating Greifswalder SC 2–0 and losing to MSV Duisburg 1–3 in extra time.

In the 1995–96 edition TSG drew Borussia Dortmund at home as its opposition in the first round, the current German champions at the time. The amateur club managed to hold Dortmund to a one all draw but lost 3–4 on penalties in front of 25,500. Its fourth appearance, in 1996–97, saw Pfeddersheim draw FSV Zwickau in the first round and exiting after a 1–2 loss. The club's fifth appearance in the German Cup ended in a 0–7 loss to TSV 1860 Munich on 27 August 2000.

After the club's sixth South West Cup triumph in 2013 the team qualified for the first cup round once more, losing to SpVgg Greuther Fürth on 2 August 2013 in the first round of the 2013–14 DFB-Pokal.

Honours
The club's honours:

League
 Verbandsliga Südwest (VI)
 Champions: 1992, 2012
 Runners-up: 1991
 Landesliga Südwest-Ost
 Runners-up: 2009
 Bezirksliga Rheinhessen
 Champions: 2007
 Runners-up: 2005

Cup
 South West Cup (Tiers III-VII)
 Winners: 1989, 1993, 1995, 1996, 2000, 2013

Recent seasons
The recent season-by-season performance of the club:

With the introduction of the Regionalligas in 1994 and the 3. Liga in 2008 as the new third tier, below the 2. Bundesliga, all leagues below dropped one tier. In 2012 the Oberliga Südwest was renamed Oberliga Rheinland-Pfalz/Saar.

References

External links
 Official team site  
 Das deutsche Fußball-Archiv  historical German domestic league tables
 TSG Pfeddersheim at Weltfussball.de  

Football clubs in Germany
Football clubs in Rhineland-Palatinate
Association football clubs established in 1982
1982 establishments in West Germany
Worms, Germany